The Memorial for Victims of the German Occupation is a monument created in memory of the German invasion of Hungary, located in Budapest's Liberty Square. The memorial has sparked controversy and angered Jewish community organizations, with critics alleging that the monument absolves the Hungarian state and Hungarians of their collaboration with Nazi Germany and complicity in the Holocaust.

Dedication 
First announced in late 2013 and approved in a closed cabinet session on New Year's Eve of 2013, the memorial was built on the night of July 20/21, 2014.

Description 
The memorial features a stone statue of the Archangel Gabriel, holding the globus cruciger of the Hungarian kings, the national symbol of Hungary and Hungarian sovereignty, and this later is about to be grabbed by an eagle with extended claws that resembles the German coat of arms, the eagle representing the Nazi invasion and occupation of Hungary in March, 1944. The date "1944" in on the eagle's ankle. The inscription at the base of the monument reads "In memory of the victims." The statue is the interpretation of the Millenium Monument of the Heroes Square in Budapest.

Gallery

References 

Antisemitism in Hungary
Belváros-Lipótváros
Buildings and structures completed in 2014
Buildings and structures in Pest County
Commemoration of Nazi crimes
Holocaust historiography
Hungarian nationalism
Jews and Judaism in Budapest
Military history of Hungary during World War II
Monuments and memorials in Hungary
The Holocaust in Hungary
Tourist attractions in Pest County
Works about Nazi Germany